Viorel Turcu (9 August 1960 – 29 November 2020) was a Romanian footballer who played as a midfielder.

International career
In 1982, Viorel Turcu played in 7 friendly matches at international level for Romania, making his debut under coach Mircea Lucescu in a 4–1 loss against Belgium. He scored his only goal in a 4–0 victory against Japan, a team against which he also played his last game for the national team, a 3–1 victory.

Honours
Argeș Pitești
Divizia A: 1978–79
Dinamo București
Divizia A: 1983–84
Cupa României: 1983–84
Steaua București
Divizia A: 1986–87
Cupa României: 1986–87

External links

External links
 
 

1960 births
2020 deaths
Association football midfielders
Romanian footballers
Romania international footballers
Liga I players
Liga II players
Nemzeti Bajnokság II players
FC Argeș Pitești players
FC Steaua București players
FC Dinamo București players
FC UTA Arad players
FC Zimbru Chișinău players
Romanian expatriate footballers
Expatriate footballers in Moldova
Romanian expatriate sportspeople in Moldova
Expatriate footballers in Hungary
Romanian expatriate sportspeople in Hungary
Romanian football managers
People from Argeș County